Lloyd Smith (5 August 1928 – 26 August 2004) was an Australian cricketer. He played eight first-class matches for Tasmania between 1950 and 1959.

See also
 List of Tasmanian representative cricketers

References

External links
 

1928 births
2004 deaths
Australian cricketers
Tasmania cricketers
Cricketers from Hobart